Spencer Milligan (born September 10, 1937) is an American actor best known for playing Rick Marshall, the father of Will and Holly Marshall, on the first two seasons of the 1970s children science fiction TV series, Land of the Lost.

Career
Milligan left the Land of the Lost after the second season. It was widely believed by fans that he left because of a "salary dispute." In fact, Milligan wanted his share of merchandising royalties that the show generated. In a 2009 interview with the Associated Press, Milligan elaborated:  On the show, Milligan's character Rick Marshall was replaced by his brother, Jack Marshall, played by actor Ron Harper. Milligan did not return for the brief scene at the beginning of "After-Shock," the first episode of the third season. This scene, which was also used in the opening credits of the third season, showed Rick Marshall being transported out of the Land of the Lost. Jon Kubichan, who both wrote and produced the episode, played the role instead, wearing a wig resembling Milligan's hair and standing with his back to the camera.

Although Spencer Milligan made various guest-starring roles on TV in the 1970s, his career cooled in the 1980s. During the 1980s Milligan lived in Malibu.  He settled in the Dallas-Fort Worth Metroplex area in the 1990s, where he taught acting at Adam Roarke's Film Actors Lab (where Lou Diamond Phillips studied). One of Milligan's students was actor Benton Jennings. Milligan eventually moved back to his family's home in Wisconsin. His last known acting performance was in 1987, when he appeared on General Hospital.

In addition to teaching acting, Milligan has directed local plays.

Filmography
A partial filmography follows.

Film
 Sleeper (1973) as Jeb Hrmthmg
 The Man From Clover Grove (1975) as Fester McLong
 The Photographer(1974) as Clinton Webber

Television

References

External links
 

People from Fort Worth, Texas
American male television actors
Place of birth missing (living people)
Living people
20th-century American male actors
1937 births